Tualatin may refer to:

Places

Oregon, United States
 Tualatin, Oregon, a city in the Tualatin Valley
 Tualatin Academy, a building and former school in Forest Grove
 Tuality Community Hospital, a hospital in Hillsboro
 Tualatin Mountains, a section of the Oregon Coast Range 
 Tualatin Plains, a lowland section of the Tualatin Valley
 Tualatin River, a tributary of the Willamette River
 Tualatin Station, a commuter rail station in Tualatin
 Tualatin Valley, the region surrounding the Tualatin River
 Tualatin Valley Highway, a state highway
 Tualatin Valley Fire and Rescue, a regional fire district

Other uses
 Tualatin (people), a part of the Kalapuya Native American tribe in western Oregon, US
 Tualatin (microprocessor), the final generation of Intel's Pentium III processor

See also
 Tualatin Plains Presbyterian Church, a church near Hillsboro